Idikarai is a panchayat town in Coimbatore district in the Indian state of Tamil Nadu. It is situated at the banks of Kousika River. The place is easily accessible by Road through public transportation.

Demographics
 India census, Idigarai had a population of 8686. Males constitute 50% of the population and females 50%. Idikarai has an average literacy rate of 80%, higher than the national average of 59.5%: male literacy is 71%, and female literacy is 90%.

Location
The main places nearby are Maniakaran Palayam, Athi palayam, Vattamalai palayam, Keeranatham, Chinna mettupalayam. Maniakaran palayam is well known for its unique location and developing industries and flats.

References

Cities and towns in Coimbatore district
Suburbs of Coimbatore